The Seed of Silence is a 2015 Colombian crime film directed by Juan Felipe Cano. The film was named on the shortlist for Colombia's entry for the Academy Award for Best Foreign Language Film at the 89th Academy Awards, but it was not selected.

Cast
 Julián Román as Roberto Guerrero
 Angie Cepeda as María del Rosario Durán
 Andrés Parra as Jorge Salcedo
 Christian Tappán as Fabrizio Mendez
 Alejandro Buitrago as Samuel Hincapié
 Julieth Restrepo as Lina

References

External links
 

2015 films
2010s crime films
Colombian crime films
2010s Spanish-language films